Michael Dylan Foster is a professor of Folklore and the current Chair of the East Asian Languages and Cultures department at the University of California, Davis. He has taught in some capacity since 1989, starting in Japan teaching the English language on the Japanese Exchange and Teaching Programme, returning to the United States to teach Japanese folklore and literature. In addition to his academic career, which has mainly focused on Japanese literature and culture, he has published several short stories, articles, and novels. Much of his work on Japanese folklore has centered on tales of the supernatural—the strange and the weird. That is the subject of his first book, Pandemonium and Parade: Japanese Monsters and the Culture of Yôkai, which received the Chicago Folklore Prize in 2009. He is the current editor of the Journal of Folklore Research.

Education
Foster studied English in his undergraduate institution of Wesleyan University, and graduated with Honors. For his Master's he studied Japanese Literature and Folklore at University of California, Berkeley, where his folklore studies were influenced by Alan Dundes. He also did intensive language study in Yokohama, Japan and studied History and Folklore at Kanagawa University. He earned his Ph.D. from Stanford University, in the department of Asian Languages: Japanese.

Published works
Books
Pandemonium and Parade: Japanese Monsters and the Culture of Yōkai. University of California Press (2009)
The Book of Yōkai: Mysterious  Creatures of Japanese Folklore. University of  California Press (2015).
 

Articles
“Haunted Travelogue: Hometowns, Ghost Towns, and Memories of War.” Mechademia 4.1 (2009) 164-181.
 “What time is this picture? Cameraphones, tourism, and the digital gaze in Japan.” Social Identities: Journal for the Study of Race, Nation and Culture Vol. 15, Issue 3 (May 2009): 351-372.
“The Otherworlds of Mizuki Shigeru.” Mechademia Vol. 3: Limits of the Human (2008): 8-28.
“The Question of the Slit-Mouthed Woman: Contemporary Legend, the Beauty Industry, and Women’s Weekly Magazines in Japan.” Signs: Journal of Women in Culture and Society, vol. 32, no. 3 (Spring 2007): 699-726. 
“Strange Games and Enchanted Science: The Mystery of Kokkuri.” The Journal of Asian Studies 65: 2 (May 2006): 251-275.
“Walking in the City with Natsume Sōseki: The Metaphorical Landscape in ‘Koto no sorane.’” Proceedings of the Association for Japanese Literary Studies, vol. 6 (Summer 2005): 137-146.
“Watashi, kirei? Josei shūkanshi ni mirareru ‘Kuchi-sake-onna’ [Am I pretty? The ‘Kuchi-sake-onna’ legend as seen in women's weekly magazines].” Ed. Komatsu Kazuhiko, Nihon yōkaigaku taizen (Tokyo: Shōgakkan, 2003): 635-667.
“Creating Monsters: Toriyama Sekien and the Encyclopedic Imagination.” Information des Akademischen Arbeitskreises Japan: Minikomi (University of Vienna) no. 64 (2002/2): 7-9.
“The Metamorphosis of the Kappa: Transformation of Folklore to Folklorism in Japan.” Asian Folklore Studies, vol. 57 (Fall 1998): 1-24.
“Kindai ni okeru kappa no henyō: kappa to mizu no kankei o megutte [Exploring the Waters: Modern Transformations of the Kappa].” Rekishi minzoku shiryōgaku kenkū (History and Folk Culture Studies), vol. 2 (1997): 161-74.

Short stories
“Looking Back.” Greensboro Review no. 67 (Spring 2000): 107-115.

“Old Mack” and “Late Night With Me.” Wisconsin Review vol. 32, no. 2 (1998): 11-14.

“Sepia.” Southern Humanities Review vol. 29, no. 4 (1995): 345-359; winner of Hoepfner Award for best short story in Southern Humanities Review (1995).

“Toothpicks.” Northwest Review vol. 30, no. 2 (1992): 59-66.

Research interests
Michael Foster's interests include Japanese folklore, history, festival, literature, supernatural, and popular culture.

He has been is working on a book entitled Visiting Strangers: Tourists, Ethnographers, and Gods, which will look at tourism, festivals, and ethnographers in Japan.

References

Wesleyan University alumni
American folklorists
Living people
University of California, Berkeley alumni
Kanagawa University alumni
Stanford University alumni
Indiana University faculty
Year of birth missing (living people)
American Japanologists